Masanori Kanehara  (born November 18, 1982) is a Japanese mixed martial artist currently competing the Bantamweight division in DEEP and Rizin FF. A professional competitor since 2003, Kanehara has formerly competed for World Victory Road, K-1, the UFC, Pancrase, ZST, and also made an appearance at Dynamite!! 2009. Kanehara is the 2009 Sengoku Featherweight Grand Prix Champion and inaugural Sengoku Featherweight Champion.

Mixed martial arts career

Early career
Kanehara made his professional mixed martial arts debut in 2003, and compiled a record of 13-6-5 before being signed by World Victory Road.

Sengoku Featherweight Grand Prix
Kanehara was announced as a participant in World Victory Road's Featherweight Grand Prix. He advanced to the semi-final round with a pair of closely contested decision victories over Jong Man Kim in the first round and Chan Sung Jung in the second round.

Kanehara lost in the semi-finals to Hatsu Hioki, but ended up replacing Hioki in the final against judoka Michihiro Omigawa after Hioki was not medically cleared due to a concussion. A 17-to-1 long shot, Kanehara ended up winning the tournament, making him the 2009 Sengoku Featherweight Grand Prix Champion and Sengoku Featherweight Champion.

Following the announcement that Sengoku Lightweight Champion Mizuto Hirota would vacate his belt, Kanehara accepted a challenge from Marlon Sandro. The two met in a Featherweight title bout at World Victory Road Presents: Sengoku 13. Kanehara lost via KO in the first round.

Post-Sengoku
After the demise of Sengoku, Kanehara compiled a record of 7-2 which included a 21-second knockout of Joe Pearson at Pancrase 252.

Ultimate Fighting Championship
In July 2014, it was announced that Kanehara had signed with the UFC. Kanehara was briefly linked to a bout with Urijah Faber on September 20, 2014 at UFC Fight Night 52.  However, before the bout was officially announced, Faber was removed and Kanehara instead faced Alex Caceres. He was successful in his debut winning via unanimous decision.

Kanehara was expected to face Rani Yahya on June 27, 2015 at UFC Fight Night 70.  However, as the event approached, several international fighters experienced travel restrictions due to technical issues within the Bureau of Consular Affairs division of the U.S. State Department which produces travel visas. The issue lead to a major altering of the card as multiple fights were postponed.  Yahya/Kanehara eventually took place on July 15, 2015 at UFC Fight Night 71. Kanehara lost the fight by split decision.

Kanehara faced Michael McDonald on January 2, 2016 at UFC 195. After a dominant first round and catching McDonald with an arm triangle in round two, McDonald slipped out and found a choke of his own. Kanehara lost the fight via submission in the second round and was subsequently released from the promotion following the loss.

Post-UFC career
After the release from the UFC, Kanehara returned to Deep and was expected to face Roman Alvarez in his promotional debut at Deep Cage Impact 2016: DEEP vs. WSOF-GC on December 17, 2016. Alvarez was replaced by Charlie Alaniz, whom Kanehara won via first-round doctor stoppage.

Next he faced Jomhod Chuwattana at DEEP Hachioji Chojin Matsuri 2018 on April 1, 2020. Kanehara won the fight via submission in the first round.

After the two victories in a row, Kanehara signed with Rizin FF and made his promotional debut against Victor Henry at Rizin 21 – Hamamatsu on February 22, 2020. Kanehara lost the fight via second-round knockout.

Kanehara faced Takahiro Ashida at Rizin 31 - Yokohama on October 24, 2021. He won the bout via TKO in the second round.

Kanehara was booked to face Kazumasa Majima on April 16, 2022 at Rizin Trigger 3. He won the fight by a third-round technical knockout.

Championships and Accomplishments
Sengoku
Sengoku Featherweight Championship (1 Time, First)
2009 Sengoku Featherweight Grand Prix Winner

Mixed martial arts record

|-
|Win
|align=center|29–14–5
|Kazumasa Majima
|TKO (punches)
|Rizin Trigger 3
|
|align=center|3
|align=center|3:37
|Chōfu, Japan
|
|-
|Win
|align=center| 28–14–5
|Takahiro Ashida
|TKO (punches and elbows)
|Rizin 31
|
|align=center|2
|align=center|1:18
|Yokohama, Japan
|
|-
|Loss
|align=center| 27–14–5
|Victor Henry
|TKO (punches)
|Rizin 21
|
|align=center|2
|align=center|0:45
|Hamamatsu, Japan 
|
|-
|Win
|align=center| 27–13–5
|Jomhod Chuwattana
|Submission (arm-triangle choke)
|Deep Hachioji Chojin Matsuri 2018 
|
|align=center|1
|align=center|1:55
|Tokyo, Japan 
| 
|-
|Win
|align=center| 26–13–5
|Charlie Alaniz
|TKO (doctor stoppage)
|Deep Cage Impact 2016: Deep vs. WSOF-GC 
|
|align=center|1
|align=center|0:30
|Tokyo, Japan 
|
|-
|Loss
|align=center| 25–13–5
|Michael McDonald
|Submission (rear-naked choke)
|UFC 195 
|
|align=center|2
|align=center|2:09
|Las Vegas, Nevada, United States
|
|-
| Loss
| align=center| 25–12–5
| Rani Yahya
| Decision (split)
| UFC Fight Night: Mir vs. Duffee
| 
| align=center| 3
| align=center| 5:00
| San Diego, California, United States
|
|-
| Win
| align=center| 25–11–5
| Alex Caceres
| Decision (unanimous)
| UFC Fight Night: Hunt vs. Nelson
| 
| align=center| 3
| align=center| 5:00
| Saitama, Japan
| 
|-
| Loss
| align=center| 24–11–5
| Toshiaki Kitada
| DQ (fighter thrown from ring)
| DEEP: 66 Impact
| 
| align=center| 1
| align=center| 1:37
| Tokyo, Japan
| 
|-
| Win
| align=center| 24–10–5
| Joe Pearson
| KO (punch)
| Pancrase 252: 20th Anniversary
| 
| align=center| 1
| align=center| 0:21
| Yokohama, Japan
| 
|-
| Win
| align=center| 23–10–5
| Wade Choate
| KO (punch)
| DEEP: 62 Impact
| 
| align=center| 1
| align=center| 4:16
| Tokyo, Japan
| 
|-
| Win
| align=center| 22–10–5
| Tom McKenna
| TKO (punches)
| DEEP: Haleo Impact
| 
| align=center| 1
| align=center| 2:45
| Tokyo, Japan
| 
|-
| Win
| align=center| 21–10–5
| Tony Reyes
| TKO (punches)
| DEEP: Tokyo Impact 2012 in Differ Ariake
| 
| align=center| 1
| align=center| 4:28
| Tokyo, Japan
| 
|-
| Win
| align=center| 20–10–5
| Jake Hattan
| Submission (rear-naked choke)
| Heat: Heat 22
| 
| align=center| 1
| align=center| 3:16
| Tokyo, Japan
| 
|-
| Win
| align=center| 19–10–5
| Brady Harrison
| Submission (rear-naked choke)
| XFS: Hillside Havoc
| 
| align=center| 3
| align=center| 3:59
| Valley Center, California, United States
| 
|-
| Loss
| align=center| 18–10–5
| Rasul Mirzaev
| TKO (punches)
| Fight Nights: Battle of Moscow 4
| 
| align=center| 1
| align=center| 1:44
| Moscow, Russia
| 
|-
| Win
| align=center| 18–9–5
| Motoshi Miyaji
| KO (punches)
| Pancrase: Impressive Tour 5
| 
| align=center| 2
| align=center| 0:09
| Tokyo, Japan
| 
|-
| Loss
| align=center| 17–9–5
| Yoshiro Maeda
| TKO (punches)
| World Victory Road Presents: Soul of Fight
| 
| align=center| 1
| align=center| 1:27
| Tokyo, Japan
| 
|-
| Loss
| align=center| 17–8–5
| Marlon Sandro
| KO (punch)
| World Victory Road Presents: Sengoku Raiden Championships 13
| 
| align=center| 1
| align=center| 0:38
| Tokyo, Japan
| 
|-
| Win
| align=center| 17–7–5
| Norifumi Yamamoto
| Decision (unanimous)
| Dynamite!! The Power of Courage 2009
| 
| align=center| 3
| align=center| 5:00
| Saitama, Japan
| 
|-
| Win
| align=center| 16–7–5
| Michihiro Omigawa
| Decision (split)
| World Victory Road Presents: Sengoku 9
| 
| align=center| 3
| align=center| 5:00
| Saitama, Japan
| 
|-
| Loss
| align=center| 15–7–5
| Hatsu Hioki
| Decision (unanimous)
| World Victory Road Presents: Sengoku 9
| 
| align=center| 3
| align=center| 5:00
| Saitama, Japan
| 
|-
| Win
| align=center| 15–6–5
| Chan Sung Jung
| Decision (unanimous)
| World Victory Road Presents: Sengoku 8
| 
| align=center| 3
| align=center| 5:00
| Tokyo, Japan
| 
|-
| Win
| align=center| 14–6–5
| Jong Man Kim
| Decision (unanimous)
| World Victory Road Presents: Sengoku 7
| 
| align=center| 3
| align=center| 5:00
| Tokyo, Japan
| 
|-
| Win
| align=center| 13–6–5
| Kenji Arai
| KO (punches)
| Pancrase: Changing Tour 1
| 
| align=center| 1
| align=center| 3:14
| Tokyo, Japan
| 
|-
| Loss
| align=center| 12–6–5
| Takafumi Otsuka
| Decision (split)
| Deep: 38 Impact
| 
| align=center| 2
| align=center| 5:00
| Tokyo, Japan
| 
|-
| Win
| align=center| 12–5–5
| Isamu Sugiuchi
| KO (punches)
| ZST: Battle Hazard 03
| 
| align=center| 1
| align=center| 0:47
| Tokyo, Japan
| 
|-
| Loss
| align=center| 11–5–5
| Erikas Petraitis
| Decision
| Shooto Lithuania: Bushido 2008
| 
| align=center| 2
| align=center| 5:00
| Vilnius, Lithuania
| 
|-
| Win
| align=center| 11–4–5
| Shunichi Shimizu
| Submission (armbar)
| ZST: ZST.16
| 
| align=center| 2
| align=center| 0:42
| Tokyo, Japan
| 
|-
| Draw
| align=center| 10–4–5
| Naoyuki Kotani
| Draw
| ZST: ZST.15: Fifth Anniversary
| 
| align=center| 2
| align=center| 5:00
| Tokyo, Japan
| 
|-
| Win
| align=center| 10–4–4
| Yoichiro Karsuyama
| Submission (rear-naked choke)
| ZST: ZST.14
| 
| align=center| 1
| align=center| 3:45
| Tokyo, Japan
| 
|-
| Loss
| align=center| 9–4–4
| Tashiro Nishiuchi
| KO (punch)
| ZST: ZST.13
| 
| align=center| 1
| align=center| 3:59
| Tokyo, Japan
| 
|-
| Win
| align=center| 9–3–4
| Arunas Jurgelenas
| Submission (choke)
| K-1 Gladiators 2007 in Estonia
| 
| align=center| 1
| align=center| 1:47
| Tallinn, Estonia
| 
|-
| Win
| align=center| 8–3–4
| Tetsu Suzuki
| Decision (majority)
| HERO'S 8
| 
| align=center| 2
| align=center| 5:00
| Nagoya, Japan
| 
|-
| Win
| align=center| 7–3–4
| Shinya Sato
| Submission (armbar)
| ZST.12
| 
| align=center| 1
| align=center| 0:56
| Tokyo, Japan
| 
|-
| Win
| align=center| 6–3–4
| Taro Himura
| Submission (armbar)
| ZST: SWAT! 08
| 
| align=center| 1
| align=center| 2:20
| Tokyo, Japan
| 
|-
| Win
| align=center| 5–3-4
| Kenichi Ito
| KO (knee)
| ZST: SWAT! 07
| 
| align=center| 2
| align=center| 1:00
| Tokyo, Japan
| 
|-
| Draw
| align=center| 4–3–4
| Hiroyuki Ota
| Draw
| ZST: SWAT! 06
| 
| align=center| 2
| align=center| 5:00
| Tokyo, Japan
| 
|-
| Win
| align=center| 4–3–3
| Hisashi Hiyama
| Submission (armbar)
| ZST: SWAT! 05
| 
| align=center| 1
| align=center| 0:56
| Tokyo, Japan
| 
|-
| Win
| align=center| 3–3–3
| Toshiyuki Saito
| KO (knee)
| ZST: SWAT! 04
| 
| align=center| 1
| align=center| 1:37
| Tokyo, Japan
| 
|-
| Loss
| align=center| 2–3–3
| Shinya Sato
| Submission (kimura)
| ZST.8
| 
| align=center| 2
| align=center| 2:47
| Tokyo, Japan
| 
|-
| Draw
| align=center| 2–2–3
| Norimasa Isozaki
| Draw
| ZST: Battle Hazard 2
| 
| align=center| 2
| align=center| 5:00
| Tokyo, Japan
| 
|-
| Draw
| align=center| 2–2–2
| Hiroyuki Ota
| Draw
| ZST: SWAT! 02
| 
| align=center| 2
| align=center| 5:00
| Tokyo, Japan
| 
|-
| Draw
| align=center| 2–2–1
| Masayuki Okude
| Draw
| ZST: SWAT! 01
| 
| align=center| 2
| align=center| 5:00
| Tokyo, Japan
| 
|-
| Win
| align=center| 2–2
| Satoru Ida
| Decision (unanimous)
| ZST: Grand Prix 2 Final Round
| 
| align=center| 1
| align=center| 5:00
| Tokyo, Japan
| 
|-
| Loss
| align=center| 1–2
| Masayuki Okude
| Submission (armbar)
| ZST: Grand Prix 2 Opening Round
| 
| align=center| 1
| align=center| 4:22
| Tokyo, Japan
| 
|-
| Win
| align=center| 1–1
| Yuki Takaya
| Submission (armbar)
| ZST.6
| 
| align=center| 1
| align=center| 2:26
| Tokyo, Japan
| 
|-
| Loss
| align=center| 0–1
| Isamu Sugiuchi
| Submission (rear-naked choke)
| Deep - 12th Impact
| 
| align=center| 2
| align=center| 1:44
| Tokyo, Japan
|

See also
 List of current UFC fighters
 List of male mixed martial artists

References

External links
Official Fight Team
 
 

Living people
1982 births
Japanese male mixed martial artists
Featherweight mixed martial artists
Mixed martial artists utilizing Brazilian jiu-jitsu
World Victory Road champions
Japanese practitioners of Brazilian jiu-jitsu
People awarded a black belt in Brazilian jiu-jitsu
Ultimate Fighting Championship male fighters